Primoz Legan (born 19 January 1983) is a Slovenian  motorcycle speedway rider who was a member of Slovenia team at 2001 Speedway World Cup.

Honours

World Championships 

 Team World Championship  (Speedway World Team Cup and Speedway World Cup)
 2001 - 12th place (0 pts in Event 2)
 2004 - 2nd place in Qualifying round 2

European Championships 

 European Club Champions' Cup
 2001 - 4th place in Group A
 2003 - started in Group A only

See also 
 Slovenia national speedway team

References

External links 
 (en) (pl) Primoz Legan at www.lubusports.pl

Slovenian speedway riders
1983 births
Living people